Development towns (Ayarat Pitu'ah) were new settlements built in Israel during the 1950s in order to provide permanent housing for a large influx of Jewish immigrants from Arab countries, Holocaust survivors from Europe and other new immigrants (Olim), who arrived to the newly established State of Israel. 

The towns were designed to expand the population of the country's peripheral areas while easing pressure on the crowded centre. Most of them were built in the Galilee in the north of Israel, and in the northern Negev desert in the south. In addition to the new towns, Jerusalem was also given development town status in the 1960s.

In the context of the Arab–Israeli conflict, Jewish refugees from Arab states were initially resettled in refugee camps, known variously as immigrant camps, ma'abarot and development towns. Development towns were subsequently considered by some to be places of relegation and marginalisation.

Background
At the end of 1949 around 90,000 Jews were housed in ma'abarot. In the aftermath of the establishment of the state, Israel’s population doubled within 2 years to 1.2 million, as Holocaust survivors and Jews from Muslim countries immigrated in mass numbers. By the end of 1951, the number had risen to over 220,000 in 125 around separate communities. The housing consisted of tents and makeshift shacks of tin or wood. Over 80% of the residents were Jewish refugees from Arab and Muslim countries of Middle East and North Africa. The numbers began to decline in 1952, and the last ma'abarot were closed sometime around 1963. Over time, the ma'abarot metamorphosed into towns, or were absorbed as neighbourhoods of the towns they were attached to, and residents were provided with permanent housing. Most of the ma'abarah camps became development towns, with Kiryat Shmona, Sderot, Beit She'an, Yokneam Illit, Or Yehuda and Migdal HaEmek all originating as ma'abarot.

Establishment

The first development town was Beit Shemesh, founded in 1950 around 20 km from Jerusalem. The newly established towns were mostly populated by Jewish refugees from Arab and Muslim countries – Morocco, Iraq, Iran, Egypt, Libya, Yemen, Syria and Tunisia. Development towns were also populated by Holocaust survivors from Europe and Jewish immigrants, who came to the newly established State of Israel. According to Khazzoom, there was a significant relationship between ethnicity and the likelihood of being placed in a development town, with many of the small number of Ashkenazi Jews sent to the towns returning to central Israel. By the 1960s and 1970s, 85–90 percent of development town residents were Mizrahi Jews, leading to an association between Mizrahi identity, peripheral location, and economic deprivation. A high proportion of the population was also religious or traditional, with a 2003 survey showing that 39% of residents would rather Israel be run more by halakhic law.

Many towns gained a new influx of residents during the mass immigration from former Soviet states in the early 1990s. By 1998, 130,000 Russian-speaking immigrants lived in development towns.

Legacy
Despite businesses and industries being eligible for favorable tax treatment and other subsidies, with the exception of Arad, most of the towns (particularly those in the south) have fared poorly in the economic sense, and often feature amongst the poorest Jewish Areas in Israel. In 1984, the Development Towns project was awarded the Israel Prize for its special contribution to society and the State of Israel.

List of development towns 

Center
Beit Shemesh
Or Yehuda
Yavne

Galilee and Valleys
Beit She'an
Karmiel
Hatzor HaGlilit
Kiryat Shmona
Migdal HaEmek
Nazareth Illit
Shlomi
Yokneam Illit

Negev
Arad
Dimona
Kiryat Gat
Kiryat Malakhi
Mitzpe Ramon
Netivot
Ofakim
Sderot
Yeruham

See also
11 points in the Negev
List of Israel Prize recipients

References 

 
Planned cities
Israel Prize for special contribution to society and the State recipients
Israel Prize recipients that are organizations
Refugee settlements
Refugees in Israel